The Norfolk Island Court of Petty Sessions was created by the Court of Petty Sessions Act 1960 (Norfolk Island), and is the equivalent of most Australian mainland Magistrates' Courts or Local Courts.

Role 
The Chief Magistrate of Norfolk Island is usually the office holder from time to time of the Chief Magistrate of the Australian Capital Territory (ACT). The Court of Petty Sessions usually sits once a month on Norfolk Island to deal with any pending criminal matters of a summary or regulatory nature. The Court can be convened by telephone/audio link up for more serious matters likely to require a committal hearing and eventual trial in the Supreme Court of Norfolk Island. Usually three Justices of the Peace or Magistrates appointed or resident locally on Norfolk Island sit as the Court of Petty Sessions in its ordinary sessions. The jurisdiction of the Court of Petty Sessions of Norfolk Island generally includes minor civil claims up to $10,000AUD and criminal matters of a summary or regulatory nature (unless they are committal hearings) as well as minor family law applications.

References 

Norfolk Island courts and tribunals
1960 establishments in Australia
Courts and tribunals established in 1960